Jon Rhattigan (born February 2, 1999) is an American football outside linebacker for the Seattle Seahawks of the National Football League (NFL). He played college football at Army.

College career
Rhattigan played for the Army Black Knights for four seasons and did not become a starter for the team until he was a senior. He finished his senior season with 78 total tackles, 9 tackles for loss, 1.5 sacks, 2 interceptions, 2 pass break ups and 2 fumble recoveries.

Professional career
Rhattigan signed with the Seattle Seahawks as an undrafted free agent on May 13, 2021. He was waived during final roster cuts on August 31, 2021, but was signed to the team's practice squad the next day. He was elevated to the active roster before the Seahawks' season opener, and later signed to the active roster. He was placed on injured reserve on January 1, 2022.

Rhattigan was placed on the Active/PUP list on July 26, 2022, and on the reserve list on August 24 to start the season. He was activated on December 10.

References

External links
Army Black Knights bio
Seattle Seahawks bio

1999 births
Living people
Players of American football from Illinois
American football linebackers
Army Black Knights football players
Seattle Seahawks players